wmd. (also known as wmd-The Inside Story.) is a political thriller released in December 2008 focused on the falsification of evidence in the build-up to the Iraq War.  The film is shot entirely from a CCTV/spy-camera perspective and follows the story of an ordinary MI6 desk officer who accidentally discovers that the American and British governments are doctoring the facts in order to convince us that invading Iraq is justifiable.  Although the story of the MI6 desk officer is fictionalized, the film is based on hard evidence that has surfaced and continues to surface, since the invasion began.

wmd. is written and directed by David Holroyd, and produced by Christine Hartland and David Holroyd.  The film stars Simon Lenagan and Montserrat Roig de Puig.

Distribution

wmd. is one of the first, if not the first, British independent films to be initially, and exclusively, released digitally.  It was first released on Dailymotion on 6 December 2008 in conjunction with an off-line premiere at the Brighton Film Festival.  The film proved so popular on Dailymotion that its run was extended several days, it became the most successful premiere ever on Dailymotion, and it was picked up by the platform for release in 16 countries.

References

External links

 Official wmd. Filmsite
  wmd. released by Amazon
 "WMD/Film Doesn't Lie," from British Film Magazine (25 March 2008)
 "The Weekly Interview: David Holroyd," from indieflicks.co.uk (30 October 2008)
 "Dailymotion Runs Online Premier for WMD," from PR Log (9 December 2008)
 wmd. released by LOVEFiLM

2008 films
British independent films
2000s thriller films
2000s English-language films
2000s British films